Won Sun-jin (born July 4, 1974) is a South Korean taekwondo practitioner. 

She won a gold medal in flyweight at the 1989 World Taekwondo Championships in Seoul. She won a bronze medal in bantamweight at the 1993 World Taekwondo Championships in New York City, and a gold medal in bantamweight at the 1995 World Taekwondo Championships in Manila.

References

External links

1974 births
Living people
South Korean female taekwondo practitioners
World Taekwondo Championships medalists
Asian Taekwondo Championships medalists
20th-century South Korean women